Charles K. "Chuck" Horst Sr. (born September 20, 1958) is an American politician and businessman serving as a member of the West Virginia House of Delegates from the 62nd district. He assumed office on December 1, 2020.

Early life and education 
Horst was born in Hagerstown, Maryland.

Career 
Outside of politics, Horst worked as an automotive technician and owns Lucky Dog Auto Repair. He was elected to the West Virginia House of Delegates in November 2020 and assumed office on December 1, 2020.

References 

Living people
1958 births
People from Hagerstown, Maryland
People from Berkeley County, West Virginia
Republican Party members of the West Virginia House of Delegates
21st-century American politicians